SJR can refer to:

Saint Joseph Regional High School, a private boys' school in Montvale, New Jersey.
Saint-Jean-sur-Richelieu, a city in Montérégie, Quebec.
Sally Jessy Raphael, American talk show host
SCImago Journal Rank, journal metric
Shin Megami Tensei: Strange Journey Redux, 3DS video game
St. John's-Ravenscourt School, a private school in Winnipeg, Manitoba.
St John Rigby College, a sixth form college in Wigan, Greater Manchester
State Journal-Register, a newspaper in Springfield, Illinois.